Horomangawa No.3 Dam  is a gravity dam located in Hokkaido Prefecture in Japan. The dam is used for power production. The catchment area of the dam is 147 km2. The dam impounds about 121  ha of land when full and can store 15379 thousand cubic meters of water. The construction of the dam was started on 1952 and completed in 1954.

References

Dams in Hokkaido